Horodiște is a village in Dondușeni District, Moldova.

Natives
Ion Druță
Constantin Stere

Bibliography
 Monitorul Oficial al R. Moldova nr.16/53 din 29.01.2002. Legea nr. 764-XV/2001 privind organizarea administrativ-teritorială a Republicii Moldova.
 Harta Topografică a Republicii Moldova 1:200,000 (actualizată în annul 2004).
 INGEOCAD, 2000. Date attributive despre populație a hărții digitale 1:400,000.
 Biroul Național de Statistică a Republicii Moldova. Rezultatele Recensămîntului Populației din 2004.

References

Villages of Dondușeni District